Fake news websites are those which intentionally, but not necessarily solely, publish hoaxes and disinformation for purposes other than news satire. Some of these sites use homograph spoofing attacks, typosquatting and other deceptive strategies similar to those used in phishing attacks to resemble genuine news outlets.

Definition
Fake news sites deliberately publish hoaxes and disinformation to drive web traffic inflamed by social media. These sites are distinguished from news satire (which is usually intended to be humorous) as they mislead and sometimes profit from readers' gullibility. While most fake news sites are portrayed to be spinoffs of other news sites, some of these websites are examples of website spoofing, structured to make visitors believe they are visiting major news outlets like ABC News  or MSNBC. The New York Times pointed out that within a strict definition, "fake news" on the Internet referred to a fictitious article which was fabricated with the deliberate motivation to defraud readers, generally with the goal of profiting through clickbait. PolitiFact described fake news as fabricated content designed to fool readers and subsequently made viral through the Internet to crowds that increase its dissemination.

The New York Times noted in a December 2016 article that fake news had previously maintained a presence on the Internet and within tabloid journalism in the years prior to the 2016 U.S. election. Except for the 2016 Philippine elections, prior to the election between Hillary Clinton and Donald Trump, fake news had not impacted the election process and subsequent events to such a high degree. Subsequent to the 2016 election, the issue of fake news turned into a political weapon, with supporters of left-wing politics saying those on the opposite side of the spectrum spread falsehoods, and supporters of right-wing politics arguing such accusations were merely a way to censor conservative views. Due to these back-and-forth complaints, the definition of fake news as used for such polemics became more vague.

List

Philippines

Fake news sites have become rampant for Philippine audiences, especially being shared on social media. Politicians have started filing laws to combat fake news and three Senate hearings have been held on the topic.

The Catholic Church in the Philippines has also released a missive speaking out against it.

Vera Files research at the end of 2017 and 2018 show that the most shared fake news in the Philippines appeared to benefit 2 people the most: Former President Rodrigo Duterte (as well as his allies) and President Bongbong Marcos, with the most viral news driven by shares on networks of Facebook pages. Most Philippine audience Facebook pages and groups spreading online disinformation also bear "Duterte", "Marcos" or "News" in their names and are pro-Duterte. Online disinformation in the Philippines is overwhelmingly political as well, with most attacking groups or individuals critical of the Duterte administration. Many Philippine-audience fake news websites also appear to be controlled by the same operators as they share common Google AdSense and Google Analytics IDs.

According to media scholar Jonathan Corpus Ong, Duterte's presidential campaign is regarded as the patient zero in the current era of disinformation, having preceded widespread global coverage of the Cambridge Analytica scandal and Russian trolls. Fake news is so established and severe in the Philippines that Facebook's Global Politics and Government Outreach Director Katie Harbath also calls it "patient zero" in the global misinformation epidemic, having happened before Brexit, the Donald Trump nomination and the 2016 United States elections.

See also

References

Lists of websites
Deception

Conspiracist media